Kamalpreet Khera  (born February 4, 1989) is a Canadian politician who has been the minister of seniors since October 26, 2021. A member of the Liberal Party, Khera was elected to represent the riding of Brampton West in the House of Commons following the 2015 federal election.

Career
Kamal Khera is a registered nurse. She attended York University where she earned an Honours Bachelors of Science in Nursing. Prior to politics, she worked as a registered nurse in the oncology unit at St. Joseph’s Health Centre Toronto.

Federal politics
Khera was nominated as the Liberal Party's candidate in Brampton West in December 2014, and won the seat in the federal election in the following October. When first elected in 2015, Khera was the youngest Liberal MP in the House, and the second-youngest overall behind the NDP's Pierre-Luc Dusseault. She was re-elected in the 2019 federal election, and in 2021.

Parliamentary Secretary

On December 2, 2015, Prime Minister Justin Trudeau appointed Khera as the Parliamentary Secretary to the Minister of Health, then as the Parliamentary Secretary to the Minister of National Revenue (January 2017 – August 2018) and from August 2018 to January 2021, Khera served as the Parliamentary Secretary to the Minister of International Development.

Khera stepped down from her role as Parliamentary Secretary to the Minister of International Development in January 2021, after having travelled to Seattle in December for a memorial service for her uncle despite the border between the United States and Canada being closed to all nonessential travel at the time due to the coronavirus pandemic.

On September 20, 2021, Khera was re-elected as the Member of Parliament for the riding of Brampton West.

On October 26, 2021, Khera was promoted to the position of Minister of Seniors in Justin Trudeau's cabinet, succeeding Deb Schulte, the outgoing Minister of Seniors who lost re-election in the riding of King-Vaughan. She is amongst the youngest members of the cabinet and the Privy Council of Canada.

Electoral record

References

External links

Official Website

Living people
1989 births
21st-century Canadian politicians
21st-century Canadian women politicians
Canadian nurses
Canadian politicians of Punjabi descent
Delhi politicians
Indian emigrants to Canada
Liberal Party of Canada MPs
Members of the 29th Canadian Ministry
Members of the House of Commons of Canada from Ontario
Members of the King's Privy Council for Canada
Politicians from Brampton
Punjabi people
Punjabi women
Women government ministers of Canada
Women members of the House of Commons of Canada
Canadian women nurses
Women in Ontario politics
York University alumni